Alf Huggett (24 October 1892 – 9 October 1972) was an Australian rules footballer who played for the Carlton Football Club in the Victorian Football League (VFL).

Notes

External links 

Alf Huggett's profile at Blueseum

1892 births
Australian rules footballers from Victoria (Australia)
Carlton Football Club players
Golden Point Football Club players
1972 deaths